Shaun Parnis (born 16 January 1980) is a Maltese international lawn bowler.

Biography
He was born in Bankstown, New South Wales, Australia and works at Dapto Citizens Bowling Club. He represented Malta in the 2006 Commonwealth Games and 2010 Commonwealth Games.

He was selected as part of the Maltese team for the 2018 Commonwealth Games on the Gold Coast in Queensland where he reached the semi finals of the Pairs with Brendan Aquilina.

In 2020, he was selected for the 2020 World Outdoor Bowls Championship in Australia. In 2022, Parnis was selected for the 2022 Commonwealth Games in Birmingham.

References

1980 births
Living people
Bowls players at the 2006 Commonwealth Games
Bowls players at the 2010 Commonwealth Games
Bowls players at the 2018 Commonwealth Games
Commonwealth Games competitors for Malta
Australian people of Maltese descent
Maltese bowls players